Beit Chlala is a village located in the Batroun District of the North Governorate in Lebanon.

References

Batroun District
Populated places in the North Governorate